Agdzhakishlag and Aghjaghshlagh may refer to:
Agdzhakishlag, Armenia
Getapnya, Armenia
Getazat, Armenia